The Fish Islands are a group of small islands lying in the northern part of the entrance to Holtedahl Bay, off the west coast of Graham Land, Antarctica. They were discovered and named by the British Graham Land Expedition, 1934–37, under John Rymill.

The Fish Islands are between Crystal Sound to the south and Grandidier Channel to the north, sheltered to the east of Renaud Island. The Fish Islands and The Minnows, small islets to the east, are occupied by an estimated 4,000 breeding pairs of Adelie penguins, and there is a small Antarctic shag (part of the imperial shag bird family) colony.

See also 
 List of Antarctic and sub-Antarctic islands

References 

Islands of Graham Land
Graham Coast